

The Blériot IX was an unsuccessful early French aeroplane built by Louis Blériot. Encouraged by the ever-increasing altitude, distance, and duration of flights with the Blériot VIII in 1908, he built a new machine along the same general lines, but heavier and with a more powerful engine. The Blériot IX was exhibited at the Paris Motor Show in December 1908, but the design proved overweight and could not be made to leave the ground.

Development
The aircraft was a wire-braced mid-winged monoplane with conventional landing gear and an open cockpit. The aircraft used two large vertically mounted steam radiators on each side. A unique feature for the time was an all-metal ground-adjustable four-blade propeller installation.

Specifications

References

 
 Devaux, Jean and Michel Marani. "Les Douze Premiers Aéroplanes de Louis Blériot". Pegase No 54, May 1989.
 Nova: A Daring Flight
 earlyaviators.com

Single-engined tractor aircraft
1900s French experimental aircraft
9
Mid-wing aircraft